DJ Switch is a British DJ and turntablist, based in Birmingham. Notable for having made remarkable achievements in his early teens, he has been crowned world champion three times, and has many appearances on television, radio, magazines, and at major festivals.

Notable Achievements
Switch won the world DMC DJ championships (specifically in the 'Battle For Supremacy' category) in 2008. He successfully defended his title for the next two years, becoming the first person to achieve a triple-win in the supremacy battle.

In 2011, Switch became the first DJ to have ever performed at the BBC Proms. He was the lead soloist in Gabriel Prokofiev's "Concerto For Turntables & Orchestra", conducted by Vladimir Jurowski & performed by the National Youth Orchestra of Great Britain. He has since performed the piece in Venezuela with the Simon Boliviar Youth Orchestra.

Other media appearances

 Blue Peter (2008) 
 1Xtra w/ Mistajam & Semtex
 BBC Breakfast

References

Living people
Year of birth missing (living people)
British hip hop DJs